The 1961 Brabantse Pijl was the inaugural edition of the Brabantse Pijl cycle race and was held on 6 April 1961. The race started and finished in  Brussels. The race was won by Pino Cerami.

General classification

References

1961
Brabantse Pijl